Emphytoecia sutura-alba is a species of beetle in the family Cerambycidae. It was described by Fairmaie and Germain in 1859. It is known from Chile.

References

Pteropliini
Beetles described in 1859
Endemic fauna of Chile